Culama suffusca is a moth in the family Cossidae. It was described by Kallies and D.J. Hilton in 2012. It is found in Australia, where it has been recorded from southern Victoria, northern New South Wales, Tasmania and the Australian Capital Territory. The habitat consists of wet sclerophyll forests.

The ground colour of the forewings is brownish grey, suffused with reddish-brown areas and with transverse black lines and streaks. The hindwings are fuscous. Adults are on wing from September to early April.

Etymology
The species name refers to the reddish-brown areas of the forewings and is derived from Latin suffusca (meaning brownish).

References

Natural History Museum Lepidoptera generic names catalog

External links

Cossinae
Endemic fauna of Australia
Moths described in 2012
Moths of Australia